Batocera matzdorffi is a species of beetle in the family Cerambycidae. It was described by Kriesche in 1915. It is known from Papua New Guinea.

References

Batocerini
Beetles described in 1915
Beetles of Oceania